The Exoatmospheric Kill Vehicle (EKV) is the Raytheon-manufactured interceptor component with subcontractor Aerojet of the U.S. Ground-Based Midcourse Defense (GMD), part of the larger National Missile Defense system.

The EKV is boosted to an intercept trajectory by a boost vehicle (missile), where it separates from the boost vehicle and autonomously collides with an incoming warhead.

The EKV is launched by the Ground-Based Interceptor (GBI) missile, the launch vehicle of the GMD system. The EKV's own rockets and fuel are for corrections in the trajectory, not for further acceleration.

The successor to the EKV, known as the Redesigned Kill Vehicle (RKV), was scheduled to debut in 2025. The RKV program, headed by Boeing and lead subcontractor Raytheon, was canceled by the Department of Defense on August 21, 2019. Earlier in the year, the Pentagon had issued a stop work order on the project following a design review deferment in December 2018 due to the failure of critical components meeting technical specification. See Next generation interceptor (NGI)

Characteristics
 Weight: approx. 140 lb (64 kg)
 Length: 55 in (4 ft. 7 in.) (1.4 m)
 Diameter: 24 in (2 ft.) (0.6 m)
 Speed of projectile: roughly 10 km/s (22,000 mph)

See also 
 Anti-ballistic missile
 Lightweight Exo-Atmospheric Projectile

References

External links
 https://web.archive.org/web/20080315061300/http://www.raytheon.com/products/ekv/
 https://archive.today/20060314045159/http://www.oss.goodrich.com/ExoatmosphericKillVehicle.shtml

Space weapons
Raytheon Company products